Teflon Brothers is a Finnish hip hop group originally from Helsinki, Finland. The band consists of Pyhimys, Heikki Kuula and Voli.

Commercial success

Teflon Brothers released their first single "Matkal kotiin" in 2006. It was also featured on a soundtrack for a film Adihasla. Their first album T followed in 2009 and peaked at number 26 on the Official Finnish Albums Chart. In April 2010, they offered a free mixtape Iso hätä, which featured songs by other artists as well.

The second Teflon Brothers album © was released in August 2010, also peaking at number 26 on the albums chart. In January 2013, the group reached number nine with their third album, Valkoisten dyynien ratsastajat. The song "Seksikkäin jäbä", featuring Stig and Meiju Suvas, also managed to enter the Official Finnish Singles Chart where it peaked at number three.

In 2014, their single "Kendo Anthem" also reached number three on the singles chart and was quickly followed by their first number-one single, "Maradona (kesä '86)". Both are included on their fourth album, Isänpäivä.

The same year, Teflon Brothers started to look for a new member to join the group through an online bidding, and hired a professional poker player Ilari Sahamies who paid 50,000 euros for the position. Sahamies appears as a featured guest on the group's 2015 song "Pämppää".

In 2021, Teflon Brothers attempted to get to represent Finland in the Eurovision Song Contest 2021. They participated in the Finnish national selection Uuden Musiikin Kilpailu with the song "I Love You", featuring Swedish singer Pandora. Eventually, they ended up in 2nd place with 180 points (2nd place with televoters and 5th with the international juries).

In June 2022, Teflon Brothers revealed they had signed a recording contract with the Estonian Universal Music Group.

Discography

Studio albums

Mixtapes
2010: Iso hätä

Singles

As featured artist

References

Finnish hip hop groups